Tarucus kiki, the Kiki's Pierrot, is a butterfly in the family Lycaenidae. It is found in Burkina Faso, northern Ivory Coast and Nigeria. The habitat consists of savanna.

The larvae feed on Ziziphus species.

References

Butterflies described in 1976
Tarucus